Amino is a social media application originally developed by Narvii, Inc. It was originally created by Yin Wang and Ben Anderson in 2012, and then launched as an app in 2016. Amino was acquired by MediaLab on September 27, 2021, and the founders are no longer associated with the application.

History
In 2012, Wang and Anderson came up with the idea for a convention-like community while attending an anime convention in Boston, Massachusetts. Later that year, they would release two apps revolving around K-pop and photography that allowed fans of those subjects to chat freely.

In 2012, Amino was officially released.

Growth
Amino received 1.65 million dollars of seed funding in 2014, primarily from Union Ventures. Some additional seed investors include Google Ventures, SV Angel, Box Group, and other interested parties.

By July 2014, Amino's apps were downloaded 500,000 times. Though only having 15 communities at that time, Amino eventually grew to have 41 communities in September 2015. Amino's apps had been downloaded 13 million times by July 2016. Fandoms had migrated from websites like Facebook and Reddit to Amino, partly because of the app's mobile-native experience.

Before 2016, when a user wanted to join a new Amino, they had to download another app for the Amino they wanted to join. In 2016, Amino Apps launched a centralized portal that hosted every Amino community in one app, meaning users no longer had to download multiple apps.

In July of the same year, ACM, an app that allowed users to create their own communities, was launched. This resulted in the number of communities on Amino skyrocketing to over 2.5 million as of June 2018.

Features
The main feature of Amino is communities dedicated to a certain topic that users can join. Users can also chat with other members of a community in three ways, text, voice, or screening room, which allows users to watch videos together while voice chatting. Other features include polls, blog posts, image posts, wiki entries, stories, and quizzes. In some cases, posts that are very well-made and have been noticed by a community’s administration will end up receiving a feature, making it appear on the front page along with other featured content.

In 2018, a premium membership option called Amino+ was added. Amino+ comes with additional features such as exclusive stickers, the ability to make stickers, custom chat bubbles, high resolution images, and other perks. Membership can be purchased with money or Amino coins. Amino coins can be purchased or earned through enabling ads, watching ad videos, completing activities on the Offer Wall, and playing Lucky Draw when checking in. Members can give and receive coins through props.

In 2019, Amino introduced six original short-form animated series, labelled "Amino Originals," produced by independent artists from across the internet. ATJ's "Little Red," a re-imagining of Little Red Riding Hood, premiered on November 15, 2019. "Little Red" was joined by five other shows in late December. Sophie Feher's "The Reef," a comedy featuring an aspiring marine biologist meeting a merman, premiered on December 27  alongside "Princely," an LGBT fairy tale created by Matt Bruneau-Richardson of Tiny Siren Animation. "Spaced Out," an alien abduction comedy by Michael Jae, and YouTuber Alex Clark's "Wyndvania II" premiered on December 28. Mysie Pereira's fairy tale "Turned to Stone" and Marcin Pawlowski's "Stranded" premiered on December 29, 2019.

Administration
On each community, there are two types of staff members, these being ‘Leader’ and ‘Curator.’ Leaders are higher rank than curators. Curators are usually the ones who feature posts, or post important announcements for users to see.

Curators are able to disable a post or public chat, delete comments or chat threads, manage featured content, manage posts in topic categories, and approve Wiki entries.

Leaders have more power than curators. In addition to curator powers, leaders can submit a community to be listed, change the Amino's features, change navigation, alter the community appearance, change the Amino's privacy settings, manage the Amino's join requests, send invites, appoint or demote Curators, strike or ban members, manage flagged content, change users' custom titles, manage topics and wiki categories, and create broadcasts (notifications sent for posts).

One leader will have the status of agent. An agent is the primary leader of a community; the person who created the community is automatically agent. An agent has the ability to delete their community as long as it is not too large or too active. An agent can appoint and remove both leaders and curators. Agent status can be transferred voluntarily to another leader, curator, or community member. If an agent is inactive, Team Amino may assist in transferring agent status.

Apps

Amino Community Manager 
Otherwise known as ACM, this application is what users use to create and manage their own community in Amino. This app allows moderators to customize a community's theme, icon, and categories. ACM also allows moderation to customize community descriptions, pick leaders, change language settings, create a tagline for the community, change the home page lay out, alter the side navigation menu, and more. Unlisted communities are able to change their community's title and Amino ID, but this is not an option once a community is listed.  A leader can use ACM to submit a request for their community to be listed on the explore page, after which the community will be reviewed by Team Amino for approval. Communities can be deleted on ACM, but only by the agent of that community.

Amino Guidelines and Enforcement 
Amino has a set of guidelines that all communities must comply with. Amino does not allow harassment or hate, spam or self-promotion (including promotion of one's own Amino community), sexual/NSFW content*, self harm, real graphic/gross content (fictional content is generally acceptable), unsafe/illegal content, or content that violates copyright. Communities are allowed to have additional rules so long as they do not violate Amino's rules. In addition to Amino's rules, users are required to be at least 13 years of age in the U.S. and 16 years of age in European Union countries.

*Note: While sexual imagery is not allowed in any community and text based sexual content is not allowed in public areas, some private communities are allowed to discuss sexual themes. However, they are not exempt from Amino's rules on NSFW content.

If guidelines are broken, a leader may disable content or impose a warning, strike, or ban, depending on the severity of the infringement. A warning is a message informing the user that they have violated a guideline and may face worse punishment unless they change their behaviour. A strike will put the user in read-only mode for up to 24 hours; this mode prevents the user from posting, chatting, or interacting with posts in that community. A ban removes the user from the community. Team Amino can separately give strikes or bans across the entire platform.

References

Social media
Social networking mobile apps